Rodney Bewes (27 November 1937 – 21 November 2017) was an English television actor and writer who portrayed Bob Ferris in the BBC television sitcom The Likely Lads (1964–66) and its colour sequel Whatever Happened to the Likely Lads? (1973–74).  Bewes' later career was of a much lower profile, but he continued to work as a stage actor.

Early life
Bewes was born in Bingley in the West Riding of Yorkshire, to Horace, an Eastern Electricity Board showroom clerk, and Bessie, who was a teacher of children with learning difficulties. His family lived for a few years in the Crossflatts district of Bingley, before they moved to Luton, where he attended Stopsley Secondary School. Because of his early ill-health (he suffered from asthma and bronchitis), one of the reasons the family moved, his mother tended to keep him off school. His illness receded, and the family eventually returned to the north.

Having seen an advertisement in the Daily Herald, Bewes auditioned for the title role in Billy Bunter of Greyfriars School just before he turned 13, and was in the last two short-listed for the role, losing to Gerald Campion. However, he did appear in two early television roles for the BBC, Mystery at Mountcliffe Chase and The Pickwick Papers (both 1952). At 14, he moved to London to attend RADA's preparatory school.

After two years of national service in the RAF, Bewes attended RADA. He was working nights in hotels, doing the washing-up, to finance his studies at RADA during the day, and hence was frequently to be found asleep in class. He was expelled during his final year.

Early career
Bewes began appearing in repertory theatre and obtained parts in the television drama series Dixon of Dock Green (1962) and Z-Cars (1963). He also appeared in the film version of Billy Liar (1963) as Arthur Crabtree, alongside his close friend Tom Courtenay. The two men shared a flat at the time; Bewes, having seen Courtenay's script, independently and successfully approached the casting director for the part. The following year his Northern working-class background and natural Northern accent stood him in good stead, landing him the role of Bob Ferris in The Likely Lads (1964–66) after Dick Clement and Ian La Frenais had seen him in Billy Liar.

In The Likely Lads, Ferris was the more ambitious of two Newcastle factory workers, with Terry Collier (James Bolam) being his lazy and more cynical friend. The series, at first broadcast on the newly launched BBC2, proved successful both critically and in the ratings when it was shown on the BBC1 and ran for three series. Between his two spells as a 'Likely Lad', Bewes also appeared in Man in a Suitcase (1967), Father, Dear Father (1968) and as "Mr Rodney" on The Basil Brush Show (1968–69). He starred in his own ITV sitcom Dear Mother...Love Albert (later known as Albert!, 1969–72), which he created and co-wrote with Derrick Goodwin.

Bewes appeared in the 1969 theatrical production of She Stoops to Conquer as Tony Lumpkin. He also appeared in the film Spring and Port Wine (1970) which starred James Mason, and played the Knave of Hearts in Alice's Adventures in Wonderland (1972). Bewes and Bolam reunited for the sequel that continued the Bob and Terry saga, Whatever Happened to the Likely Lads? (1973–74). It ran for two series of 13 episodes, followed by a Christmas special in 1974. The original series was adapted for radio (1967–68) as was the sequel (1975), and a cinema spin-off (The Likely Lads, 1976) also followed.

Bewes' later film roles included Jabberwocky (1977), Unidentified Flying Oddball (1979) and The Wildcats of St Trinian's (1980). Although better known for his comedy and light entertainment roles, viewers were given an opportunity to see Bewes's serious acting ability in a made-for-TV film adaptation of John Ford's 17th century play, 'Tis Pity She's a Whore (1980). Despite a guest role in the Doctor Who serial Resurrection of the Daleks in 1984, his television career had largely ended by the mid-1980s.

Later career
On the West End stage, Bewes appeared in the play Middle-Age Spread and Funny Money, a farce by Ray Cooney.

In 1981, he starred in "A Very Private Man" on BBC Radio.  During 1982, he served as spokesman for the now defunct trade organisation, the British Onion Marketing Board, appearing in a number of print advertisements during the year.

Bewes remained active as a stage performer in the 1990s and later with one-man versions of Three Men in a Boat and Diary of a Nobody, both of which shows he toured extensively in the UK.

Bewes final appearance on television was in 2009 when he played retired bank manager Edward Walton in the Heartbeat episode Ties That Bind.

In July 2013, he was The Marshal (Philippe Pétain) in the Southwark Playhouse production of Peter Ustinov's The Moment of Truth. He was back in Edinburgh again in 2015 for an autobiographical show, An Audience with Rodney Bewes... Who?

Bewes' autobiography, A Likely Story, was published in September 2005. In the autobiography, and on Michael Parkinson's BBC Radio 2 show in  2005, he stated that his Likely Lads co-star James Bolam had not spoken to him for the past 30 years. It had been assumed for years that Bolam and Bewes were friends off-screen as well as on; a pretence they kept up because their public expected it. However, they had comprehensively fallen out when Bewes indiscreetly related a personal anecdote about Bolam in a 1976 press interview, and they had not spoken since. He blamed Bolam's fear of having his privacy invaded, and of being eternally typecast, leading to his refusing to allow repeats of The Likely Lads. The final breach, said Bewes, occurred when, having told an anecdote about the birth of his own triplets, he followed on with a story of how Bolam's wife, actress Susan Jameson, had told him she was pregnant while he was driving, and he almost crashed the car. Bewes repeated this story, thinking it was already public knowledge; but then, on realising he might have crossed a line, phoned Bolam to forewarn him of the article, and got a frosty reaction. "There was this dreadful silence. He put the phone down. I called him back, he didn't answer. He hasn't spoken to me since."

In 2010, Bewes also complained about his former co-star's refusal to allow The Likely Lads to be repeated on network television (both had to give approval), preventing him from earning anything from the repeats; "He must be very wealthy; me, I've just got an overdraft and a mortgage". Shortly before he died, in an interview with the Daily Mirror, Bewes once more lamented the loss of his friendship with Bolam. Bolam, however, denied such a rift ever existed, stating after Bewes' death that they "didn't talk for 40 years because of their busy schedules rather than resentment", and he had "nothing but fond memories" of Bewes. Bolam denied he had the ability to block repeats of the TV series.

Death
Bewes died on 21 November 2017, shortly before his 80th birthday, in his seaside home at Cadgwith in Cornwall. He is survived by a daughter and three sons.

Filmography

Film

Television

References

External links

 
 Feature from Wales on Sunday, archived by The Free Library

1937 births
2017 deaths
20th-century English male actors
21st-century English male actors
20th-century Royal Air Force personnel
Alumni of RADA
English autobiographers
English male film actors
English male television actors
Male actors from Yorkshire
People from Bingley